Lin Ying-meng (born 20 October 1983) is a Taiwanese politician. She has served as a councillor of Taipei City Council since 2018. She was elected councillor representing Taipei City District 6 during the local elections, and is one of the first openly LGBT people voted into local legislatures in Taiwanese history.

Early life and education
Lin Ying-meng was born in Taichung on 20 October 1983. She received her education in Stella Matutina Girls' High School, a Catholic missionary school in the city.

She obtained a Bachelor of Humanities and Sociology from National Tsing Hua University (NTHU), situated in the neighbouring city of Hsinchu. She then pursued a Master of Sociology in the prestigious National Taiwan University (NTU).

When Lin was a child, she was fond of anime, and used to aspire to be a cartoonist. She did field research work in a maid café for two years, in order to understand the social phenomenon. The experience helped her write her graduation thesis in NTU's research institute. Lin assisted in developing mobile apps in a game company after her studies.

Social activism and political career
Lin was initially a volunteer in social movement organisations. She started to know fellow activists Wu Cheng (吳崢) and Freddy Lim during the 2014 Sunflower Student Movement. When the NPP won seats in the Legislative Yuan, the national parliament, Lin was motivated to take part in parliamentary work.

On 24 March 2017, Lin was appointed spokeswoman of NPP headquarters.

As a social and political activist, Lin is concerned about topics such as gender, culture, politics, human rights, political status of Taiwan, transitional justice, generational justice (世代正義) as well as marriage equality. She previously also served as leader of the bills (proposed legislation) team in Legislator Freddy Lim's Office.

She took office as councillor of Taipei City in 2018, on Constitution Day, which coincides with Christmas Day. Her term will end in 2022. As a member of the legislature in the capital of Taiwan, the Taipei City Government and Mayor is responsible to her and her colleagues. When questioned by Lin in 2019, the administration in Taipei confirmed that all same-sex couples who intended to marry on 24 May, the date when same-sex marriage was implemented nationwide, within the capital would be able to do so. All Household Registration Offices would work overtime to accommodate these couples.

Lin left the New Power Party in August 2020. Lin hired her then-boyfriend, Yeh Yao-chang, as a political aide at the start of her term as councillor. She also paid a student for part-time work. After the student left her office, Lin continued applying for the subsidy that would have paid the student. Separately, Yeh left Lin's office to establish a public relations company, and Lin was accused of forging documents on Yeh's behalf, placing an employee of his on her payroll so that the employee would be paid with public funds.

Personal life
Lin has come out openly as a bisexual woman. On 20 January 2018, she announced during the NPP's anniversary that she would run for the seat of councillor representing Daan-Wenshan, becoming one of the first openly LGBT officials in Taiwan.

Notable works

See also
 Kao Chia-yu

References

External links
 
 Lin Ying-meng's election campaign website
 Councillor Lin Ying-meng, Taipei City Council.

1983 births
Living people
21st-century Taiwanese politicians
Politicians of the Republic of China on Taiwan from Taichung
21st-century Taiwanese women politicians
Bisexual women
Taiwanese LGBT politicians
New Power Party politicians
Taipei City Councilors
National Tsing Hua University alumni
National Taiwan University alumni
Bisexual politicians
Taiwanese bisexual people
Taiwanese LGBT rights activists
Women local politicians in Taiwan